Bruno Miguel Fernandes Ribeiro (born 22 October 1975) is a Portuguese football manager and former player who is now the head coach at Campeonato de Portugal club Moura.

A midfielder with a powerful left-foot strike, he began his playing career with hometown club Vitória Setúbal from 1994 to 1997, before he had a four-year spell in England with Leeds United and Sheffield United. He returned to Portugal to play for União de Leiria, Beira-Mar and Santa Clara, before spending 2003 to 2010 back with Vitória Setúbal. He spent the majority of his career in the Primeira Liga, though also spent time in the second tier, and in the English Football League and Premier League. He made a total of 351 career appearances, scoring 21 goals. He won all of his honours with Vitória Setúbal, winning promotion out of the second tier in 1995–96 and 2003–04, winning the Taça de Portugal in 2005, and Taça da Liga in 2008, whilst picking up runners-up medals in the Supertaça Cândido de Oliveira in 2005 and Taça de Portugal in 2006. He also won five caps for the Portugal under-21 team in 1997.

He was promoted from youth coach to first team coach at Vitória Setúbal in 2011, and went on to have brief spells in charge at Farense, Moura, Pinhalnovense, Vitória Setúbal (again), Ludogorets Razgrad (Bulgaria), and Académico de Viseu. He was appointed manager of English club Port Vale in June 2016, where he worked for six months before tendering his resignation. He returned to Portugal and took charge at Salgueiros for a two-month spell in April 2017. He was appointed Cova da Piedade head coach in November 2017, leaving this post the following summer. He briefly took charge at Salgueiros in October 2018, before returning to another former club, Vitória Setúbal, to coach the juniors the following month. In January 2019 he emigrated to Angola to coach Interclube, before returning to Portugal 11 months later as head coach at Olhanense. He was reappointed as Moura's head coach in September 2020.

Playing career
Bruno Miguel Fernandes Ribeiro was born in Setúbal, and progressed through the youth ranks at local Primeira Divisão club Vitória Setúbal to make the first team bench for the first time on 29 May 1994. A left-sided midfielder with a powerful shot, he also possessed a quick temper and was liable to pick up yellow and red cards. His first team debut came  on 29 September 1994, when he came on as a 66th-minute substitute for Paulo Gomes in a 3–0 defeat to Gil Vicente at the Estádio Adelino Ribeiro Novo. He scored his first goal for the club on 28 May 1995, in a 4–1 victory over União da Madeira, and ended the 1994–95 season with one goal in eleven appearances as the club suffered relegation. He then scored two goals in nine games as they won promotion at the first attempt in 1995–96. He played a further 21 top-flight matches in the 1996–97 campaign, where he was spotted by Leeds United manager George Graham, who had been scouting Jimmy Floyd Hasselbaink. Ribeiro also won five caps for the Portugal under-21 team.

Ribeiro was sold to English Premier League club Leeds United for a fee of £500,000 in July 1997, making him a teammate of Hasselbaink, who also joined the club in the summer. He scored his first goal for Leeds in his second appearance, a 3–1 victory over Sheffield Wednesday at Hillsborough, and went on to score a total of four goals in 35 games in the 1997–98 season. However, he picked up an injury at the start of the 1998–99 season, and failed to win back his first team place under new manager David O'Leary. He left Elland Road in October 1999, as he was sold on to First Division side Sheffield United for £500,000 in October 1999. He made 22 appearances in the 1999–2000 season and eight appearances in the 2000–01 season, mostly as a substitute as he failed to secure a first team spot at Bramall Lane. He returned to Portugal on loan at União de Leiria in January 2001.

He spent the 2001–02 season with Beira-Mar, scoring one goal in 26 games. He joined Azores based club Santa Clara for the 2002–03 campaign, scoring twice in 25 games as the club suffered relegation. He subsequently rejoined Vitória, with the club now playing in the second division, and played 27 games (scoring one goal) as Vitória were promoted back into the top-flight after finishing in second-place in 2003–04. He remained a key first team player throughout the 2004–05, 2005–06 and 2006–07 campaigns, making 90 first team appearances across the three seasons. He helped the club to win the Taça de Portugal in 2005, as they beat Benfica 2–1 at the Estádio Nacional. He also captained the club in the 2005 Supertaça Cândido de Oliveira, as Vitória lost 1–0 to Benfica; he was replaced by Antonio Franja on 75 minutes. He then played in the 2006 Taça de Portugal Final, where they were beaten 1–0 by Porto. He was unable to play in the 2006 Supertaça Cândido de Oliveira due to injury.

Ribeiro gradually lost his importance in the squad in the 2007–08 season, though he scored the 1–0 winner with a long-range effort against Sporting CP on 24 February. He also played in the final of the Taça da Liga, as Vitória beat Sporting CP on penalties to lift the trophy; he was taken off for Paulinho on 67 minutes. He was loaned out to Chaves at the start of the 2009–10 season, however after Manuel Fernandes was reinstated as Vitória's first team coach, Ribeiro returned to the squad in January 2010. He played seven games in the remainder of the 2009–10 campaign and helped the club to avoid relegation, before he announced his retirement in the summer.

Managerial career

Early career
In March 2011, Ribeiro succeeded Manuel Fernandes as head coach at Vitória Setúbal, having previously coached the club's under-17 team. He was sacked following a 3–0 away defeat to Braga on 13 February 2012 that placed the team last in the league; he later harshly criticized the board of directors. Vitória went on to avoid relegation at the end of the 2011–12 season under the stewardship of new manager José Mota. In June 2012, Ribeiro was appointed as head coach at Farense in the lower leagues. From March to November 2014 he worked with Moura, also in the third tier. He returned to Vitória Setúbal in January 2015, taking over from Domingos Paciência, and managed to steer the club away from relegation at the end of the 2014–15 season despite only winning three of his 17 games in charge. He decided to leave the club at the expiry of his contract, stating that he was satisfied with his accomplishment.

Ludogorets and Académico de Viseu
In June 2015, he was appointed as head coach at Bulgarian Parva Liga champions Ludogorets Razgrad, and told the Bulgarian media: "José Mourinho is like a brother of mine [Mourinho was youth team coach at Vitória Setúbal in the 1990s]... it is possible that some Chelsea players will join Ludogorets [on loan]. I'll talk with Mourinho and see what happens. Without doubt he is going to help us". However, Ludogorets recorded three losses in Ribeiro's first three matches, including elimination from the UEFA Champions League qualifying rounds and defeat in the 2015 Bulgarian Supercup, and he was sacked after less than two months in charge with the club claiming it was a "disciplinary sacking and unilateral termination of the contract" due to "his prolonged absence from the job despite a standing and binding contract". Ribeiro stated that the club signed players without his knowledge and the sporting director further eroded his authority by interfering in training sessions. Coach Andy Smith later recalled how "mafia types with firework" tried to attack the pair of them in Bulgaria. In February 2016, Ribeiro returned to Portugal and signed a contract at LigaPro side Académico de Viseu to run until the end of the 2016–17 season. However, he resigned from the club on 10 March after failing to win any of his five matches in charges, citing dissatisfaction with the way the club was being run.

Port Vale
In June 2016, he was appointed manager of English League One club Port Vale on a three-year contract. He oversaw a complete overhaul of the playing staff, signing an influx of foreign talent including Rigino Cicilia, Anthony de Freitas, Kjell Knops, Calvin Mac-Intosch, Quentin Pereira, Kiko, Carlos Saleiro, Paulo Tavares, Chris Mbamba, Sébastien Amoros, Miguel Santos, and Gëzim Shalaj; as well as British players Anton Forrester and Jerome Thomas, Nathan Ferguson, and Martin Paterson; with Alex Jones and Sam Hart also joining on loan. However it would be 20-year old centre-back Nathan Smith who would prove to be the club's best player; Riberio handed him his debut on the opening day of the season, and Smith would retain his first-team place long after Riberio's departure. He appointed Jak Alnwick, Ben Purkiss and Anthony Grant as joint-captains, and got off to a good start by winning his first six home games at Vale Park. He was named as the Football League Paper's League One Manager of the Day after Vale defeated Scunthorpe United 3–1 on 27 August. However they entered Christmas in 17th-place, leaving chairman Norman Smurthwaite to declare that 'Plan B' had been triggered, meaning the signing of "seasoned, higher grade" players, whilst he admitted he felt "a little bit hoodwinked" as Ribeiro's friends in the game (José Mourinho, Aitor Karanka, and Carlos Carvalhal) had provided him with glowing references but had thus far failed to lend any of their players to the Vale. Ribeiro resigned as manager of Port Vale on 26 December, hours after witnessing his side lose 1–0 at home to Walsall. Assistant manager Michael Brown took charge on a caretaker basis, but could not arrest the decline as the club went on to be relegated at the end of the 2016–17 season.

Return to Portugal
Ribeiro was appointed head coach at Campeonato de Portugal club Salgueiros on 6 April 2017 following the sacking of Filipe Cândido. The contract was to cover only the final five games of the 2016–17 season. Salgueiros finished third in the North zone Promotion group, missing out on a place in the promotion play-offs on goal difference.

On 14 November 2017, Ribeiro was appointed as the new head coach at Cova da Piedade, who were in the relegation places of the LigaPro after picking up only 13 points from their first 13 games. On 6 December, he led the team to a penalty shoot-out victory over top-flight Marítimo following a 0–0 draw after extra-time in the Fifth Round of the Taça de Portugal at the Estádio do Marítimo. The "Rapazes de Azul-Grená" ended the 2017–18 season in ninth-place and he was reported to have agreed a new one-year contract in May 2018. However he left the club the following month. On 7 October, he was appointed as manager of former club Salgueiros, now in the Porto FA Elite Division (fourth tier), until the end of the 2017–18 season. He left this post after just two games when was appointed as head coach of the Vitória Setúbal junior team.

Interclube
In January 2019, Ribeiro signed an 18-month contract with Angolan Girabola side Interclube. "Os Polícias" finished fifth at the end of the 2018–19 season.

Return to Portugal
On 31 December 2019, Riberio returned to Portuguese football as the new manager of Campeonato de Portugal side Olhanense. The "Leões de Olhão" were top of Serie D when the 2019–20 season was ended prematurely due to the COVID-19 pandemic in Portugal, with no clubs promoted from Serie D. On 8 September 2020, Ribeiro returned to manage Moura in the Campeonato de Portugal. Moura picked up just four points from 20 games as they were relegated in the 2020–21 campaign.

Style of management
Ribeiro has stated that 90% of his training ground work is based on José Mourinho's ideas, using possession play, building from the back – instructing his players not to play long balls, and maintaining a fixed shape. He prefers to play with a 4–3–3 formation, utilising a lone striker. Andy Smith, Ribeiro's close friend and preferred coach, has said that Ribeiro is "class" and that "the coaching sessions, the way he prepares" means that "we have a plan A, B and C". Ribeiro prefers staff, such as Smith, to conduct media duties on his behalf. He likes to create a "family" feeling in the dressing room.

Career statistics

Playing statistics

Managerial statistics

Honours

as a Player
Vitória de Setúbal
Segunda Divisão de Honra second-place promotion: 1995–96
Segunda Liga second-place promotion: 2003–04
Supertaça Cândido de Oliveira runner-up: 2005
Taça de Portugal: 2005; runner-up 2006
Taça da Liga: 2008

as a Manager
Ludogorets
Bulgarian Supercup runner-up: 2015

References

1975 births
Living people
Sportspeople from Setúbal
Portuguese footballers
Portugal under-21 international footballers
Association football midfielders
Vitória F.C. players
Portuguese expatriate footballers
Expatriate footballers in England
Portuguese expatriate sportspeople in England
Leeds United F.C. players
Sheffield United F.C. players
U.D. Leiria players
S.C. Beira-Mar players
C.D. Santa Clara players
G.D. Chaves players
Primeira Liga players
Liga Portugal 2 players
Premier League players
English Football League players
Association football coaches
Portuguese football managers
Vitória F.C. managers
S.C. Farense managers
C.D. Pinhalnovense managers
Expatriate football managers in Bulgaria
PFC Ludogorets Razgrad managers
Académico de Viseu F.C. managers
Expatriate football managers in England
Port Vale F.C. managers
S.C. Salgueiros managers
Expatriate football managers in Angola
G.D. Interclube managers
S.C. Olhanense managers
Primeira Liga managers
English Football League managers